The OnePlus 10T is  a high-end Android-based smartphone manufactured by OnePlus, unveiled on August 3, 2022.

References

External links 

OnePlus mobile phones
Phablets
Android (operating system) devices
Mobile phones introduced in 2022
Mobile phones with multiple rear cameras
Mobile phones with 4K video recording